The Shops at South Town, formerly South Towne Center, is a regional shopping mall in Sandy, Utah, United States, located just east of Interstate 15 on State Street. The property, built in 1986, contains  of retail space with 150 stores and restaurants. It has 4 anchor spaces with a plot for fifth that has never been built. The anchor stores are Round 1 Entertainment, HomeGoods, and JCPenney. There are two vacant anchor stores that were Forever 21 and Macy's.

The mall opened in 1986 with a single anchor being ZCMI (later Meier & Frank then Macy's). JCPenney opened in 1992. Mervyns (later Forever 21) was added in 1994. A Montgomery Ward Specialty Store was planned to open 1995 but fell through and became Dillard's which opened in 1997. A large Cineplex Odeon cinema opened in 1990 as the largest cinema in the state at the time with 2,350 seats spread across 10-screens. It closed in February 2001 as part of Loews Cineplex Entertainment bankruptcy. The building was gutted in 2002 now housing a REI sports store and Momentum Indoor Climbing.

The mall underwent the first phase of an interior and exterior remodel from 2015 to 2017, and was officially unveiled on February 14, 2017. Phase 2 is currently underway. The redevelopment is part of Sandy's  city center development project, The Cairns.

In early 2013, former management company Macerich announced that they put the mall up for sale and had several interested buyers. It has since been purchased and, as of February 2017, is currently managed by Pacific Retail.

In May 2017, it was announced that a Round One Entertainment location (now open) would  be coming to the mall in August 2018 as part of the mall's ongoing renovation. Other renovations in the second phase of redevelopment include remodeling the former Dillard's space; extending the concourse to include Round 1 Entertainment, and HomeGoods along with other shops; remodeling an atrium and adding skylights; additional lounge seating, digital kiosks, and exterior glazing; and a new play area for children. In October 2019, following the Chapter 11 bankruptcy of Forever 21, it was announced that the South Town location would close by the end of the year unless agreements were made with the landlord. The location closed the following January.

On January 6, 2021, it was announced that Macy's would close in mid-2021 as part of a plan to close 46 nationwide. After Macy's closed, JCPenney is the only traditional anchor store left.

Anchor stores 
JCPenney
Round 1 Entertainment (originally Dillard's) 
HomeGoods; originally Dillard's)

Former anchors 
Macy's (originally ZCMI, then Meier & Frank, closed mid-2021)
Forever 21 (originally Mervyns)
Dillard's (planned as a Montgomery Ward Specialty Store)

Junior anchors 
H&M

Marketplace 
The Marketplace which opened in 1996 is located adjacent to the Shops at South Town, and is a  outdoor retail property, anchored by a Super Target store. Other major retailers include Barnes & Noble, Old Navy, and Buy Buy Baby (formerly Linens 'n Things. A Sports Authority (formerly Gart Sports) moved across the street to The Commons and is now a Obstacle Warrior Kids indoor playground. The Marketplace was built in the mid 1990s about a decade after the mall opened.

References

External links

 

Shopping malls in Utah
Buildings and structures in Sandy, Utah
Tourist attractions in Salt Lake County, Utah
Shopping malls established in 1986
1986 establishments in Utah